Dedication is an album by the Bay City Rollers, issued in September 1976. It was the band's fourth original studio album, and the first new album to be released in the wake of their enormous worldwide success of early 1976.

Founding group member Alan Longmuir had been replaced by Ian Mitchell prior to the recording sessions.  Upon the switch, Mitchell was slotted as rhythm guitarist; Stuart Wood moved from rhythm guitar to bass.  Mitchell also provided the lead vocal for the title track.  However, when he left the band later that year, a version of "Dedication" featuring a Les McKeown vocal was cut for subsequent pressings of the LP and was in fact released as a single.

Track listing

UK edition, Bell Records #8005

Side one
"Let's Pretend" (Eric Carmen)
"You're a Woman" (Eric Faulkner, Stuart Wood)
"Rock 'N Roller" (Faulkner, Wood)
"Don't Worry Baby" (Brian Wilson, Roger Christian)
"Yesterday's Hero" (Harry Vanda, George Young)

Side two
"My Lisa" (Tony Sciuto, Sammy Egorin)
"Money Honey" (Faulkner, Wood)
"Rock 'N Roll Love Letter" (Tim Moore)
"Write a Letter" (Wood, Les McKeown, Ian Mitchell)
"Dedication" (Guy Fletcher, Doug Flett)

US edition, Arista Records #4093

Side one
"Let's Pretend" (Carmen) – 3:31
"You're a Woman" (Faulkner, Wood) – 4:15
"Rock 'N Roller" (Faulkner, Wood) – 3:30
"I Only Want to Be With You" (Mike Hawker, Ivor Raymonde) – 3:36
"Yesterday's Hero" (Vanda, Young) – 4:33

Side two
"My Lisa" (Scutio, Egorin) – 3:35
"Don't Worry Baby" (Wilson, Christian) – 3:03
"Are You Cuckoo?" (Russ Ballard) – 4:05
"Write a Letter" (Wood, McKeown, Mitchell) – 3:47
"Dedication" (Fletcher, Flett) – 3:54

Personnel
Les McKeown – lead and backing vocals
Eric Faulkner – lead guitar, backing vocals; co-lead vocals on "Rock 'N Roller"
Ian Mitchell – rhythm guitar, backing vocals; lead vocals on "Dedication"
Stuart "Woody" Wood – bass, backing vocals; co-lead vocals on "Rock 'N Roller"
Derek Longmuir – drums, percussion, backing vocals

Charts

Weekly charts

Year-end charts

Singles

References

Bay City Rollers albums
1976 albums
Albums produced by Jimmy Ienner
Arista Records albums
Bell Records albums